The women's sprint competition at the 2023 FIL World Luge Championships was held on 27 January 2023.

Results
The qualification was held at 10:15 and the final at 14:21.

References

Women's sprint